Kutta is a small village in Ponnampet taluk of Kodagu, in Karnataka state of India.

Location
Kutta is the southern tip of Kodagu district. It is located at a distance of 86 kms from district headquarters, Madikeri and 32 kms from taluk headquarters, Ponnampet on SH-89 and 260 kms from state capital, Bengaluru.

Geography
The village is bounded by Coffee plantation and Paddy fields to the north, Brahmagiri Mountain Range to the west, Nagarahole to the east and Tholpetty wildlife Sanctuary of Wayanad district to the south. Kutta is situated on SH-89 of Karnataka and no major state highway of Kerala is connected to Kutta. Mananthavady (28 kms) and Kalpetta (52 kms) are the two major towns of Kerala, near to Kutta.

National Park and Safari
Kutta (Nanchhi Gate) is one of the three entry points to Nagarhole National Park, the other two being Veeranahosalli Gate and Karmadu Gate(Balele-Mysore Road),the latter does not host safari. The Tholpetty wildlife Sanctuary of Kerala, lies south of Kutta village.

Post Office
Kutta has a post office. The pincode is 571250.

Tourist attractions

 Pakshi Pathalam is a hillock near Kutta which can be reached by trekking seven kilometers from Thirunelli temple.  There is a cave on the hillock with many bird species.
 Iruppu Falls
 Kabini backwaters
 Brahmagiri Wildlife Sanctuary
 White water rafting, Barapole river
 Tadiandamol
 Banasura Sagar Dam
 Banasura Hill
 Chembra Peak
 SAI Sanctuary

Transportation & Connectivity
Kutta bus station is a terminal for both Karnataka buses and Kerala buses.  There is a jeep stand at the end of the street.
Nearest Railway stations are Thalassery railway station (106 kms) and Mysuru Junction railway station (120 kms). Nearest International Airports are Kannur International Airport (106 kms), Calicut International Airport (135 kms) and Mangalore International Airport (212 kms).

References

Villages in Kodagu district